Jack Fillmore Betts, also credited as Hunt Powers, is an American character actor and playwright. He has acted in film, on stage, and on television.

Career
Betts portrayed Chris Devlin in the CBS mystery series Checkmate (1960-1962). He also played Mr. Fisher, an 80-year-old man on One Life to Live in 1982.

Among his numerous television appearances were four roles on the CBS drama series Perry Mason, including the role of Bert Nickols in the 1961 episode, "The Case of the Impatient Partner," Enos Watterton in the 1962 episode “The Case of the Double Entry Mind”, murder victim George Parsons in the 1964 episode, "The Case of the Wooden Nickels," and murder victim Bruce Strickland in the 1966 episode, "The Case of the Fanciful Frail.

Betts is also the author of Screen Test: Take One, a play about a soap opera that originated on a film set.

Filmography

References

External links
 
 
 
 Hunt Powers at the University of Wisconsin's Actors Studio audio collection
 

American male film actors
American male stage actors
American male soap opera actors
American male television actors
Male actors from Miami
Male Spaghetti Western actors
Year of birth missing (living people)
Living people